Hinterland: Caribbean Poetry from the West Indies and Britain is a 1989 poetry anthology edited by E. A. Markham. In a long introductory essay Markham writes:

"I wanted in this to identify and celebrate a broad range of aesthetic experience — those verbal, intellectual and musical constructs that both trap and release aspects of our particular history, geography, racial and social tension [...]".

The book contains biographies and prose writing by and about the poets.

Poets included in Hinterland
 Louise Bennett
 Martin Carter
 Derek Walcott
 Edward Kamau Brathwaite
 Dennis Scott
 Mervyn Morris
 James Berry
 E. A. Markham
 Olive Senior
 Lorna Goodison
 Linton Kwesi Johnson
 Michael Smith
 Grace Nichols
 Fred D'Aguiar

See also
 1989 in poetry
 1989 in literature
 20th century in literature
 20th century in poetry
 Caribbean poetry
 English poetry
 List of poetry anthologies

1989 poetry books
1989 anthologies
Poetry anthologies
British poetry anthologies
Caribbean literature